The Shahjahannama (Chronicle of Shah Jahan) is a genre of works written about the Mughal Emperor Shah Jahan. Padshahnama is a term for lavishly illuminated versions.

A significant work in this genre was written by the historian Inayat Khan in the 17th century. The first complete English translation from Persian appeared in the 19th century by A. R. Fuller.

References

External links
 
Mughal literature
17th-century Indian books
17th-century history books
History books about the 17th  century
History books about India
Indian literature
Books about the Mughal Empire
Indian chronicles